A Little Thing Called Murder is a 2006 comedy-drama television film starring Judy Davis and Jonathan Jackson and directed by Richard Benjamin.

Made by Stonemade Entertainment for Lifetime TV, the film was based on a true story of convicted murderer Sante Kimes, as told in the book Dead End by reporter Jeanne King. A 2001 made-for-TV film about Kimes titled Like Mother, Like Son starred Mary Tyler Moore.

Synopsis
Sante Kimes is a con artist and thief who has been preparing her son Kenny since childhood to be her accomplice. Sante is living with a rich man, Ken Kimes, who is unwilling to marry her and makes no provision for Kenny in his will. The boy's mother becomes involved in robberies, arson and the murder of an elderly woman to enrich herself, with her son as her partner in crime.

Cast
 Judy Davis as Sante Kimes
 Jonathan Jackson as Kenny Kimes
 Chelcie Ross as Ken Kimes Sr.
 Cynthia Stevenson as Beverly Bates
 Ryan Robbins as Shawn Little
 Alexander Ludwig as Young Kenny Kimes

Awards and nominations
The film won Best Motion Picture Made for Television in the 11th Golden Satellite Awards.

Judy Davis won Best Actress in a Miniseries or a Motion Picture Made for Television in the 11th Golden Satellite Awards. Davis was also nominated for Outstanding Lead Actress in a Miniseries or a Movie in the Emmy Awards.

The casting team was nominated for Best Movie of the Week Casting by the Casting Society of America in its 2006 Artios Awards.

References

External links

Lifetime (TV network) films
2006 television films
2006 films
Films directed by Richard Benjamin
2000s crime drama films
American crime drama films
Films scored by John Frizzell (composer)
2006 drama films
American drama television films
2000s English-language films
2000s American films